Daniele Liotti (born 1 April 1971, in Rome) is an Italian actor. He performed in more than thirty films since 1993.

Selected filmography

External links 
 

Italian male film actors
1971 births
Living people
Male actors from Rome